Walt Whitman (1819–1892) was an American poet, essayist and journalist.

Walt Whitman may also refer to:
 Walt Whitman (actor) (1859–1928), American stage and silent film actor
 Walt Whitman (Davidson), a 1939 statue by Jo Davidson
 Walt Whitman Bridge, a bridge that spans the Delaware River
 Walt Whitman High School (Bethesda, Maryland)
 Walt Whitman High School, South Huntington, a high school in Huntington Station, New York
 Walt Whitman Shops, a shopping mall in Huntington Station, New York

See also 
 Walt Whitman Award, an annual award conferred by the Academy of American Poets
 Walt Whitman Birthplace State Historic Site, a site in Huntington, New York
 Walt Whitman House, a residence of Walt Whitman in New Jersey
 Walt Whitman Rostow (1916–2003), United States economist and political theorist
 Whitman (disambiguation)
 Whitman (surname)

Whitman, Walt